The Victorian Rally Championship was the evolution series of car rallies in Victoria, Australia.  Prior to 1972, car rallies/trials relied heavily on the ability of a navigator to read a map and direct their driver over a planned course covering shire roads and forest tracks at night.

In 1972 the series evolved in line with the improvement of forest tracks, and the population of properties along Shire roads – into a more driver-oriented event.

Route instructions became comprehensive, making it easier for a crew to avoid getting lost, and results were effectively determined by how fast the drivers drove on the generally narrow forest roads.

Since 1990, many of these events have been held during daylight hours – making the competition more attractive to spectators.

At present, the Victorian Rally Championship includes awards for overall champion, two wheel drive champion, and class champions.  Two single car make championships are associated with the Victorian Rally Championship:  The Fiesta Rally Series and the Grant Walker Parts Excel Rally Series.

Victorian Rally Champions

Winners of the Victorian Rally Championship and the preceding Victorian Trials Championship are as follows:

* Driver and navigator were not from the same crew.
** Victorian Rally Championship introduced; previously, this was known as the Victorian Trials Championship.

Since 2003, there has been a separate Two Wheel Drive Championship contested as part of the Annual Championships.
Winners of the Victorian 2WD Rally Championship are as follows:

References

Rally racing series
Auto racing series in Australia
Rally competitions in Australia